Aleksandar Borković (born 11 June 1999) is an Austrian footballer who plays for Sturm Graz on loan from 1899 Hoffenheim II.

Club career 
Borković grew up in the Austria Wien.

On 26 August 2020, he signed with German club 1899 Hoffenheim II.

On 30 August 2021, he moved to Sturm Graz on a two-year loan.

References

1999 births
Footballers from Vienna
Living people
Austrian footballers
Austria youth international footballers
Austria under-21 international footballers
Association football defenders
FK Austria Wien players
TSG 1899 Hoffenheim II players
SK Sturm Graz players
Austrian Football Bundesliga players
2. Liga (Austria) players
Regionalliga players
Austrian expatriate footballers
Expatriate footballers in Germany